Steven or Steve Taylor may refer to:

Steve Taylor (missiologist) (born 1968), New Zealand theologian
 Steve Taylor (psychologist) (born 1967), English author and lecturer in psychology
 Steven John Taylor, American singer and keyboardist for the band Rogue Wave
 Steve Taylor (politician) (born 1956), American politician and Delaware state legislator
 Steven W. Taylor (born 1949), American politician and Oklahoma Supreme Court justice
 Steve Taylor (footballer) (born 1955), English footballer in The Football League
 Steve Taylor (born 1957), American singer, songwriter and film director
 Steve Taylor & The Perfect Foil, a supergroup led by Steve Taylor
 Steven Taylor (cricketer, born 1963) (born 1963), English cricketer
 Steve Taylor (Canadian football) (born 1967), quarterback
 Steven Taylor (American cricketer) (born 1993), American cricketer
 Steven Taylor (footballer) (born 1986), English footballer 
 Steve Taylor, the narrator for the YouTube channel Kurzgesagt
 John Mahan (1851–1883), also known as Steve Taylor, Irish-born American bare-knuckle boxer and pugilist

Fictional characters
 Steven Taylor (Doctor Who), one of the First Doctor's companions
Steve Taylor, a character in the 2008 British slasher movie Eden Lake

See also
 Stephen Taylor (disambiguation)
 List of people with surname Taylor